is a Japanese swimmer who competes in the Women's 400m individual medley. At the 2012 Summer Olympics she finished 20th overall in the heats in the Women's 400 metre individual medley and failed to reach the final.

References

1992 births
Living people
Olympic swimmers of Japan
Swimmers at the 2012 Summer Olympics
Swimmers at the 2016 Summer Olympics
Japanese female medley swimmers
Swimmers at the 2014 Asian Games
Universiade medalists in swimming
Universiade silver medalists for Japan
Asian Games competitors for Japan
Medalists at the 2011 Summer Universiade
21st-century Japanese women